Antônio Carlos Rodrigues dos Santos Júnior, better known as Antônio (born March 30, 1989), is a Brazilian defensive midfielder. He currently plays for Flamengo.

Career

Fluminense
Carioca, the defensive midfielder half began his career in Futsal. His first steps were on the court of Vila Isabel. There, caught the attention of other clubs, and ended up at Fluminense.

Flamengo
Thanks to its prominence in soccer, the head-of-area was invited to transfer to Flamengo and make the transition to the football field. Since then she has been doing its part and collecting evidence. In two years, the first one as the second year of youth and the second as the first year of junior, won five trophies, including two Campeonato Carioca, one in each category.

Brazil U-20
In the 2008 season, Antônio has continued in the juniores team in his second and final year in the category, with good participation on the team. In between, he was captain of the Brazil U-20 then headed by Rogério Lourenço and was not the World category because they are severely injured.

Americano, CFZ do Rio and Return to Flamengo
In early 2010 was promoted to professional, but without many opportunities came to be loaned to Americano who will not be seized and returned Gávea, where Antônio headed to the club partner, the CFZ do Rio in order to recover from injury suffered years before. Later, with the arrival of Zico as executive in charge of football and under the tutelage of Rogério Lourenço, the shuttle returned to Flamengo in order to be integrated into the senior team to compete in the 2010 Brazilian Championship.

Career statistics
(Correct )

according to combined sources on the Flamengo official website and Flaestatística.

Honours

Youth
 Flamengo
Copa Macaé de Juvenis: 2006
Torneio Internacional de São Lourenço: 2006
Campeonato Carioca de Juvenis: 2006
Campeonato Carioca de Juniores: 2007
Taça Belo Horizonte: 2007

Contract
Flamengo.

References

External links
 Player profile @ Flapédia
 ogol

1989 births
Living people
CR Flamengo footballers
Americano Futebol Clube players
Duque de Caxias Futebol Clube players
Association football midfielders
Footballers from Rio de Janeiro (city)
Brazilian footballers